Nathaniel David Rateliff (born October 7, 1978) is an American singer and songwriter based in Denver whose influences are described as folk, Americana and vintage rhythm & blues. Rateliff has performed with a backing band called the Night Sweats for an R&B side project he formed in 2013. He has released three solo albums, two solo EPs, and one album as Nathaniel Rateliff & the Wheel.

Career
Rateliff was born in St. Louis, Missouri on October 7, 1978. He grew up in Hermann, Missouri learning to play the drums at age seven. As a teenager he taught himself guitar, began writing songs, and at eighteen moved to Denver.

2002–2008: Born in the Flood 
In 2002, Rateliff formed Born in the Flood, quickly garnering a large following in Denver and headlining local festivals like the Westword Music Showcase. In February 2007, Born in the Flood released their first full-length album If This Thing Should Spill. Despite increasing success with Born in the Flood, Rateliff turned down an offer from Roadrunner Records and shifted his focus to a more stripped-down, solo effort, playing somber, singer-songwriter content under his name and "Nathaniel Rateliff & the Wheel".

2007–2014: Nathaniel Rateliff & the Wheel

In 2007, while still performing with Born in the Flood, Rateliff began recording and performing more personal, somber content both solo and with BitF bandmate and lifetime collaborator Joseph Pope III (bass/guitar/vibes/organ/harmonica). The project expanded with more live performances, adding Julie Davis (upright bass/vocals), Carrie Beeder (organ/violin), James Han (keys/vibes), and Ben Desoto (drums/flute). Shortly after the breakup of Born in the Flood, Rateliff released Desire and Dissolving Men on Public Service Records. Nathaniel Rateliff then released In Memory of Loss in the USA on Rounder Records in May 2010, and then in the UK on Decca in March 2011. In Memory of Loss was recorded with producer Brian Deck (Iron & Wine). On September 17, 2013, Rateliff released Falling Faster Than You Can Run on Mod y Vi Records. On the same day he set out on a tour with The Lumineers and Dr. Dog, in support of the album.

2013–present: Nathaniel Rateliff & the Night Sweats 

Beginning in 2013 while still performing and recording with earlier solo and group projects, Rateliff embarked on a more upbeat, soulful sound with longtime collaborator Joseph Pope III and other collaborators in shows around Denver and Boulder. On June 24, 2015, the self-titled release of Nathaniel Rateliff & the Night Sweats via Stax Records was announced with the lead single being "S.O.B.". The Night Sweats feature Joseph Pope III (bass), Mark Shusterman (keyboards) and Patrick Meese (drums). Other band members include Luke Mossman (guitar), Wesley Watkins (trumpet), and Andy Wild (saxophone). According to the Los Angeles Times, this was "an album Rateliff made as a last-ditch effort before throwing in the towel on his music career, only to see it go viral and turn into a runaway hit."

In November 2016, he released the 8-track EP A Little More From...
Nathaniel Rateliff & the Night Sweats released a new album titled Tearing at the Seams on March 9, 2018. After spending a week recording 18 songs with his band, Rateliff was not content and decided to return to the studio for five days with his band's rhythm section and three more days with the horns section, producing seven to eight new songs he felt were "appropriate, the right tempo and the right mood". The band shared the record's lead single "You Worry Me". Produced by Richard Swift and being offered in 12-track standard and 14-track deluxe editions, the band assembled in Rodeo, New Mexico for the initial writing and recording sessions for the album.

In February 2018, "You Worry Me", the lead single from Tearing at the Seams, their second studio album, hit number one on the Adult Alternative Songs charts. It would later hit the top 10 on the Alternative Songs chart in June 2018. Tearing at the Seams was released on March 9, 2018. The album debuted at number 11 on the Billboard 200 for the week of March 24, 2018, and debuted on the Alternative Albums chart at number 5.

In August 2019, Nathaniel Rateliff & The Night Sweats launched a limited cannabis cartridge line titled "Nightstache Collection" in collaboration with Willie's Reserve. The first release was the strain AJ's Cherry AK. The band developed a friendship with Willie Nelson when they met at Farm Aid in 2016.

In November 2019, Nathaniel Rateliff announced a solo tour to support a new solo album via Stax Records. On January 8, 2020, Nathaniel announced And It's Still Alright, his first solo album in nearly seven years which was released February 14 via Stax Records.

Rateliff supported the Bernie Sanders 2020 presidential campaign, and Nathaniel Rateliff & the Night Sweats performed at a campaign rally in Saint Paul, Minnesota.

On December 17, 2020, Nathaniel released "Redemption", a new song he wrote for the Apple Original film, Palmer. The release came as a surprise to Rateliff's fans, since he did not announce it beforehand.

In early 2021, Nathaniel appeared in his first Saturday Night Live performance on February 13. His two-song set included the recently released "Redemption" and "A Little Honey" off of Tearing at the Seams.

On November 5, 2021, Nathaniel Rateliff & The Night Sweats released their third studio album, The Future, via Stax Records. In support of the album, Sirius XM The Spectrum introduced Night Sweats Radio with Nathaniel Rateliff which debuted October 22, 2021 airing new episodes every Friday.

Recognition

Rateliff developed a dedicated following within the Denver music community. The New York Times dubbed him a Denver local folk-pop hero. Spin praised his "massive, alluring" voice. Billboard dubbed the unsigned singer-songwriter a "must hear." This wave of acclaim led to a solo tour opening for The Fray, which brought his work to the attention of national and international audiences. Rateliff was featured on the late-night music television series Later... with Jools Holland on BBC in 2011. Rateliff has also shared the stage with artists including Bon Iver, Mason Jennings, Iron & Wine, Ben Howard, Michael Kiwanuka, The Low Anthem, Mumford & Sons, Laura Marling, and Rosanne Cash among others, They were on stage with The Lumineers in Denver for the United States presidential election debates, 2012. On August 5, 2015, Nathaniel Rateliff & The Night Sweats made their late-night television debut on The Tonight Show Starring Jimmy Fallon. The band played Ontario's WayHome Music & Arts Festival and Austin City Limits in 2016. Nathaniel Rateliff & The Night Sweats were the featured musical guests on Saturday Night Live on February 13, 2021. Rateliff and The Nightsweats most recently performed on The Tonight Show playing their new song "Face Down In The Moment" (rollingstone.com/music/music-news/nathaniel-rateliff-night-sweats-face-down-in-the-moment-fallon-1234596232/).

Discography

Albums

Studio albums

As solo artist

As Nathaniel Rateliff & the Wheel

As Nathaniel Rateliff & the Night Sweats

Live albums

As solo artist

As Nathaniel Rateliff & the Night Sweats

EPs

As solo artist

As Nathaniel Rateliff & the Night Sweats

Singles

As solo artist

As Nathaniel Rateliff & the Night Sweats

Notes

Music videos
Solo
 "Still Trying" (2014)
 "And It's Still Alright" (2020)
 "What A Drag" (2020)

as Nathaniel Rateliff & The Night Sweats
 "Look It Here" (2015)
 "Howling at Nothing" (2015)
 "Howling at Nothing" (Director's Cut) (2015)
 "S.O.B." (2015)
 "I Need Never Get Old" (2016)
 "Wasting Time" (2016)
 "A Little Honey" (2018)

References

External links

 
 

Stax Records artists
Decca Records artists
Singers from Missouri
Rounder Records artists
Living people
1978 births
People from Hermann, Missouri
American soul singers
American blues guitarists
American male guitarists
American tenors
Singers from Denver
Concord Records artists
21st-century American guitarists
21st-century American singers
Guitarists from Colorado
Guitarists from Missouri
Musical groups established in 2005
21st-century American male singers